Yuseflu or Yusoflu may refer to:
 Yuseflu, Ahar
 Yusoflu, Khoda Afarin